In immunology, peripheral tolerance is the second branch of immunological tolerance, after central tolerance.  It takes place in the immune periphery (after T and B cells egress from primary lymphoid organs). Its main purpose is to ensure that self-reactive T and B cells which escaped central tolerance do not cause autoimmune disease.  Peripheral tolerance prevents immune response to harmless food antigens and allergens, too.  

Deletion of self-reactive T cells in the thymus is only 60-70% efficient, and naive T cell repertoire contains a significant portion of low-avidity self-reactive T cells. These cells can trigger an autoimmune response, and there are several mechanisms of peripheral tolerance to prevent their activation. Antigen-specific mechanisms of peripheral tolerance include persistent of T cell in quiescence, ignorance of antigen and direct inactivation of effector T cells by either clonal deletion, conversion to regulatory T cells (Tregs) or induction of anergy. Tregs, which are also generated during thymic T cell development, further suppress the effector functions of conventional lymphocytes in the periphery. Dendritic cells (DCs) participate in the negative selection of autoreactive T cells in the thymus, but they also mediate peripheral immune tolerance through several mechanisms.

Dependence of a particular antigen on either central or peripheral tolerance is determined by its abundance in the organism. B cell peripheral tolerance is much less studied and is largely mediated by B cell dependence on T cell help.

Cells mediating peripheral tolerance

Regulatory T cells 
Tregs are the central mediators of immune suppression and they play a key role in maintaining peripheral tolerance. The master regulator of Treg phenotype and function is Foxp3. Natural Tregs (nTregs) are generated in the thymus during the negative selection. TCR of nTregs shows a high affinity for self-peptides, Induced Tregs (iTreg) develop from conventional naive helper T cells after antigen recognition in presence of TGF-β and IL-2. iTregs are enriched in the gut to establish tolerance to commensal microbiota and harmless food antigens. Regardless of their origin, once present Tregs use several different mechanisms to suppress autoimmune reactions. These include depletion of IL-2 from the environment, secretion of anti-inflammatory cytokines IL-10, TGF-β and IL-35 and induction of apoptosis of effector cells. CTLA-4 is a surface molecule present on Tregs which can prevent CD28 mediated costimulation of T cells after TCR antigen recognition.

Tolerogenic DCs 
DCs are a major cell population responsible for the initiation of the adaptive immune response. They present short peptides on MHCII, which are recognized by specific TCR. After encountering an antigen with recognition danger or pathogen-associated molecular patterns, DCs start the secretion of proinflammatory cytokines, express costimulatory molecules CD80 and CD86 and migrate to the lymph nodes to activate naive T cells.  However, immature DCs (iDCs) are able to induce both CD4 and CD8 tolerance. The immunogenic potential of iDCs is weak, because of the low expression of costimulatory molecules and a modest level of MHCII. iDCs perform endocytosis and phagocytosis of foreign antigens and apoptotic cells, which occurs physiologically in peripheral tissues. Antigen-loaded iDCs migrate to the lymph nodes,  secrete IL-10, TGF-β and present antigen to the naive T cells without costimulation. If the T cell recognizes the antigen, it is turned into the anergic state, depleted or converted to Treg. iDCs are more potent Treg inducers than lymph node resident DCs. BTLA is a crucial molecule for DCs mediated Treg conversion. Tolerogenic DCs express FasL and TRAIL to directly induce apoptosis of responding T cells. They also produce  indoleamine 2,3-dioxygenase (IDO) to prevent T cell proliferation. Retinoic acid is secreted to support iTreg differentiation, too. Nonetheless, upon maturation (for example during the infection) DCs largely lose their tolerogenic capabilities.

LNSCs 
Aside from dendritic cells, additional cell populations were identified that are able to induce antigen-specific T cell tolerance. These are mainly the members of lymph node stromal cells (LNSCs). LNSCs are generally divided into several subpopulations based on  the expression of gp38 (PDPN) and CD31 surface markers. Among those, only fibroblastic reticular cells and lymphatic endothelial cells (LECs) were shown to play a role in peripheral tolerance. Both of those populations are able to induce CD8 T cell tolerance by the presentation of the endogenous antigens on MHCI molecules. LNSCs lack expression of the autoimmune regulator, and the production of autoantigens depends on transcription factor Deaf1. LECs express PD-L1 to engage PD-1 on CD8 T cells to restrict self-reactivity. LNSCs can drive the CD4 T cell tolerance by the presentation of the peptide-MHCII complexes, which they acquired from the DCs. On the other hand, LECs can serve as a self-antigen reservoir and can transport self-antigens to DCs to  direct self-peptide-MHCII presentation to CD4 T cells. In mesenteric lymph nodes(mLN), LNSCs can induce Tregs directly by secretion of TGF-β or indirectly by imprinting mLN-resident DCs.

Intrinsic mechanisms of T cell peripheral tolerance 
Although the majority of self-reactive T cell clones are deleted in the thymus by the mechanisms of central tolerance, low affinity self-reactive T cells continuously escape to the immune periphery. Therefore, additional mechanisms exist to prevent self-reactive and unrestained T cells responses.

Quiescence 
When naive T cells exit the thymus, they are in a quiescent state. That means they are in the G0 stage of the cell cycle and they have low metabolic, transcriptional and translational activities. Quiescence can prevent naive T cell activation after tonic signaling. After antigen exposure and costimulation, naive T cells start the process called quiescence exit, which results in proliferation and effector differentiation.

Ignorance 
Self-reactive T cells can fail to initiate immune response after recognition of self-antigen. The intrinsic mechanism of ignorance is when the affinity of TCR to antigen is too low to elicit  T cell activation. There is also an extrinsic mechanism.  Antigens, which are present in generally low numbers, can´t  stimulate T cells sufficiently. Specialized mechanisms ensuring ignorance by the immune system have developed in so-called immune privileged organs. The abundance of antigen and anatomical location is the most important factors in T cell ignorance. In the inflammatory context, T cells can override ignorance and induce autoimmune disease.

Anergy 

Anergy is a state  of functional unresponsiveness induced upon self antigen recognition. T-cells can be made non-responsive to antigens presented if the T-cell engages an MHC molecule on an antigen presenting cell (signal 1) without engagement of costimulatory molecules (signal 2). Co-stimulatory molecules are upregulated by cytokines (signal 3) in the context of acute inflammation. Without pro-inflammatory cytokines, co-stimulatory molecules will not be expressed on the surface of the antigen presenting cell, and so anergy will result if there is an MHC-TCR interaction between the T cell and the APC.  TCR stimulation leads to translocation of NFAT into the nucleus. In the absence of costimulation, there is no MAPK signaling in T cells and translocation of transcription factor AP-1 into the nucleus is impaired. This disbalance of transcription factors in T cells results in the expression of several genes involved in forming an anergic state.  Anergic T cells show long-lasting epigenetic programming that silences effector cytokine production. Anergy is reversible and T cells can recover their functional responsiveness in the absence of the antigen.

Peripheral deletion 

After T cell response to co-stimulation-deficient antigen, a minor population of T cells develop anergy and a large proportion of T cells are rapidly lost by apoptosis. This cell death can be mediated by intrinsic pro-apoptotic family member BIM. The balance between proapoptotic BIM and the antiapoptotic mediator BCL-2 determine the eventual fate of the tolerized T cell.  There are also extrinsic mechanisms of deletion mediated by the cytotoxic activity of Fas/FasL or TRAIL/TRAILR interaction.

Immunoprivileged organs 
Potentially self-reactive T-cells are not activated at immunoprivileged sites, where antigens are expressed in non-surveillanced areas. This can occur in the testes, for instance. Anatomical barriers can separate the lymphocytes from the antigen, an example is the central nervous system (the blood-brain-barrier). Naive T-cells are not present in high numbers in peripheral tissue but stay mainly in the circulation and lymphoid tissue.

Some antigens are at a too low concentration to cause an immune response – a subthreshold stimulation will lead to apoptosis of a T cell.

These sites include the anterior chamber of the eye, the testes, the placenta and the fetus, and the central nervous system. These areas are protected by several mechanisms:
Fas-ligand expression binds Fas on lymphocytes inducing apoptosis, anti-inflammatory cytokines (including TGF-beta and interleukin 10) and blood-tissue-barrier with tight junctions between endothelial cells.

In the placenta IDO breaks down tryptophan, creating a "tryptophan desert" micro environment which inhibits lymphocyte proliferation.

Split tolerance
Since many pathways of immunity are interdependent, they do not all need to be tolerised. For example, tolerised T cells will not activate autoreactive B cells. Without this help from CD4 T cells, the B cells will not be activated.

References

Immune system
Immunology